Kunzea clavata, commonly known as the Torbay spearwood, is a flowering plant in the myrtle family, Myrtaceae and is endemic to a small area on the south coast of Western Australia. It blooms between September and October producing yellow flowers.

Description
The flowers are arranged in dense heads of 22 to 34 mainly on the ends of the longer branches. Flowering occurs in September and October and is followed by fruit which are urn-shaped capsules.

Taxonomy and naming
Kunzea clavata was first formally described in 1996 by Hellmut R. Toelken from a specimen collected near Bornholm and the description was published in Journal of the Adelaide Botanic Gardens. The specific epithet (clavata) is derived from the Latin word meaning "clava", meaning "club" referring to the leaves often being shaped like a baseball bat.

Distribution and habitat
Torbay spearwood is often found around marshes and on the margins of lakes in coastal areas of the Great Southern region of Western Australia centred around Albany in the Jarrah Forest and Warren biogeographic regions.

Conservation
Kunzea clavata is classified as "not threatened" by the Western Australian Government Department of Parks and Wildlife.

References

clavata
Endemic flora of Western Australia
Myrtales of Australia
Rosids of Western Australia
Plants described in 1996
Taxa named by Hellmut R. Toelken